The Women's Junior European Volleyball Championship is a sport competition for national teams with players under 20 years, currently held biannually and organized by the European Volleyball Confederation, the volleyball federation from Europe. As of the 2024 edition, the CEV will align the age limit for the men's and women's competitions to U20.

Results summary

Medal summary

Participating nations

References

External links
Home page
CEV Women's Junior Volleyball European Championship – Competition History

 
Women's U20
Volleyball
European volleyball records and statistics